Cratia, Crateia or Krateia was a town in the interior of ancient Bithynia, which also bore the name Flaviopolis, which clearly dates from the imperial period, and probably the time of Vespasian. The Antonine Itinerary places it between Claudiopolis and Ancyra of Galatia, 24 M. P. from the former. An autonomous coin with the epigraph κρη is attributed to this place; and there are coins of the imperial period, from Antoninus Pius to Gallienus. It became an episcopal see. Under the name Cratia it remains a titular see of the Roman Catholic Church. It may also have borne the name Agrippeia.

Its site is located near Gerede in Asiatic Turkey.

References

Populated places in Bithynia
Former populated places in Turkey
Roman towns and cities in Turkey
History of Bolu Province
Catholic titular sees in Asia
Gerede District